Lucian Itu (born 8 September 1978) is a Romanian footballer and manager who is currently under contract with Metalurgistul Cugir. In his career Itu also played for teams such as Minerul Lupeni or Inter Curtea de Argeș.

Honours

Player
CSO Cugir
Liga III: 2020–21
Liga IV: 2012–13

Manager
CSO Cugir
Liga III: 2020–21

External links
 
 

1978 births
Living people
Romanian footballers
Association football midfielders
Association football forwards
Liga I players
Liga II players
CS Minerul Lupeni players
FC Internațional Curtea de Argeș players
AFC Săgeata Năvodari players
Romanian football managers
People from Cugir